Eduardo De Santis (September 7, 1929 - March 25, 2019) was an Italian actor, film producer, writer and philanthropist, best known as the founder and chairman of Gold Mercury International Award a think tank and global governance award organisation founded in 1961.

Actor 
Following a few initial jobs as a salesman in Italy, Eduardo De Santis, motivated by the glamour of Hollywood productions being shot in Rome in the 1940s and 1950s, decides to start a career as an actor. During that time he befriended many Hollywood stars that had fallen in love with Rome and were shooting in the 'Citta Eterna' (Eternal City) films like Quo Vadis? (1951), Three Coins in the Fountain (1954), Roman Holiday (1953), Spartacus (1960), Ben Hur (1959), and Cleopatra (1963).  His first movie breakthrough was in 1953 in the film The Ship of Condemned Women, where he played the role of a sailor. He then went to act in ten more movies including Giuseppe Verdi (1953) and Guai ai Vinti (1955).

Film producer and writer on social issues 
Following his acting career he moved into production and scriptwriting working in Italy and the US. In the 1970s he witnessed the growth of Home Video in the US. Seeing the potential of the technology coming to Europe, he started buying the rights to movie libraries for Home Video in preparation for home video arriving in Europe.

Attracted by social issues, he developed the story and co-produced the El Espontaneo (The Rash One) in 1964. Directed by Jorge Grau and starring Fernando Rey and Luis Ferrin, the movie is a drama with a strong social message about inequality and poverty in cities. The movie is about Paco a young bellboy working in a luxury hotel in Madrid during Franco's dictatorship in Spain. As a side job, Paco re-sells tickets to tourists to go watch bullfights. After Paco unfairly loses his job, due to a rich client complaint, he is unable to find a new job. Without a job, his friends and family turn their backs on him. Desperate, with his working mother becoming ill, his last chance to make it is to jump in the bullfighting arena as a 'spontaneous' bullfighter to demonstrate his skills and win the chance to strike it rich. The movie is shot in Black and White (the world of Paco). The movie switches to colour in the last scenes as Paco arrives in the colour rich 'fiesta' bullfighting arena, jumps in with the bull and is tragically killed. The message of the movie is that we are all 'Espontaneos' like Paco, trying to make it in the difficult going ons of life.

Corporate Social Responsibility and Global Governance work 
His interest in social issues and international affairs led him to create in 1961 Gold Mercury International Award a think tank to improve international governance and corporate responsibility.  He developed the Gold Mercury Awards to recognise companies, organisations and governments that advanced good governance practices and peaceful co-operation. The Awards have been presented since 1961 to global corporations and leaders including US President Ronald Reagan, Soviet leader Leonid Breznev and Ellen Johnson Sirleaf President of Liberia. De Santis has focused his think tank work on the development of anticipatory governance and foresight development tools which he believes will dramatically improve decision making.

Professional Life and Global Branding Career 
In the late 1970s Eduardo De Santis met brand and packaging design guru Walter Landor. Landor convinced De Santis to join his firm based in San Francisco California. He became a partner of the firm. De Santis helped internationalise the company and turn it into a global branding firm. Landor was sold to Young & Rubicam (now part of WPP plc) in 1991. Famous branding projects De Santis has worked on include the re-branding of Santander Bank, Iberia Airlines, Cepsa petroleum company, Iberdrola energy and savings bank 'la Caixa' in which the famous Catalan painter Joan Miró was engaged.

Personal life 
De Santis was born in Positano, Italy. Eduardo De Santis was married to Spanish actress Maria Cuadra. They met in the movie set of 'Le Belle dell'Aria' (Beauties of the Sky) a Spanish Italian co-production of 1957 where both played roles as actors. They have three children but are now divorced. Eduardo De Santis was a close friend of Ettore Scola, Italian film director and his brother Pietro Scola.

Awards and Recognitions 
Eduardo De Santis is a Commander of the Italian Republic and was recently Awarded by Italy's President Napolitano the Ordine della Stella d'Italia – OSI (Order of the Italian Star) for his services to the nation. Other recipients of the Order include: Henry Cabot Lodge, American Ambassador to the UN; President John F. Kennedy, former President of the U.S.A; Russian composer Igor Stravinsky and Italo-American legend Frank Sinatra.

External links 
 Gold Mercury International Official Site
 World Directory of think tanks, National Institute for Research Advancement Japan

References 
 El Pais Newspaper - Obituary Eduardo De Santis
 El Mundo Newspaper - Profile Eduardo De Santis
 
 
 La Razon Newspaper Article - Eduardo De Santis Awarded Italian Star Medal from President Napolitano
 Eduardo De Santis Bio at Gold Mercury International

Italian male film actors
Italian businesspeople
20th-century Italian male actors
1929 births
2019 deaths